The 2018–19 Turkish Cup was the 57th season of the tournament. Ziraat Bankası was the sponsor of the tournament, thus the sponsored name was Ziraat Turkish Cup. The winners will earn a berth in the group stage of the 2019–20 UEFA Europa League, and also qualify for the 2019 Turkish Super Cup.

Competition format

First round 
 42 Regional Amateur League teams competed in this round. No seeds were applied in the single-leg round.

AL: Regional Amateur League. Ranks are determined by the guidelines in 2018–19 Turkish Cup Regulations.

 10 seeded (48%) and 11 unseeded (52%) teams qualified for the next round.

|colspan="3" style="background-color:#D0D0D0" align=center|28 August 2018

|-
|colspan="3" style="background-color:#D0D0D0" align=center|29 August 2018

|}

Second round 

 53 Third League and 21 Regional Amateur League teams competed in this round. No seeds were applied in the single-leg round.

3L: Third League, AL: Regional Amateur League. Ranks are determined by the guidelines in 2018–19 Turkish Cup Regulations.

 24 teams (45%) from Third League and 13 teams (62%) from the Regional Amateur League qualified for the next round.
 17 seeded (46%) and 20 unseeded (54%) teams qualified for the next round.
 Biggest upset was Dersim 62 Spor (no ranking) eliminating Karaköprü Belediyespor (ranked 99th).
 Lowest-ranked teams qualifying for the next round were Dersim 62 Spor and Bitlis Özgüzeldere (both with no ranking).
 Highest-ranked team eliminated was Bucaspor (ranked 72nd).

|colspan="3" style="background-color:#D0D0D0" align=center|11 September 2018

|-
|colspan="3" style="background-color:#D0D0D0" align=center|12 September 2018

|-
|colspan="3" style="background-color:#D0D0D0" align=center|13 September 2018

|}

Third round 

 5 Super League, 18 First League, 36 Second League, 24 Third League and 13 Regional Amateur League teams competed in this round. Seeds were applied in the single-leg round.

SL: Super League, 1L: First League, 2L: Second League, 3L: Third League, AL: Regional Amateur League. Ranks are determined by the guidelines in 2018–19 Turkish Cup Regulations.

 5 teams (100%) from Super League, 13 teams (72%) from First League, 17 teams (47%) from Second League, 11 teams (46%) from Third League and 2 teams (15%) from the Regional Amateur League qualified for the next round.
 30 seeded (63%) and 18 unseeded (38%) teams qualified for the next round.
 Biggest upset was Dersim 62 Spor (no ranking) eliminating Gaziantepspor (ranked 38th).
 Lowest-ranked team qualifying for the next round was Dersim 62 Spor (no ranking).
 Highest-ranked team eliminated was Gazişehir Gaziantep FK (ranked 23nd).

|colspan="3" style="background-color:#D0D0D0" align=center|25 September 2018

|-
|colspan="3" style="background-color:#D0D0D0" align=center|26 September 2018

|-
|colspan="3" style="background-color:#D0D0D0" align=center|27 September 2018

|}

Fourth round 
 13 Super League, 13 First League, 17 Second League, 11 Third League and 2 Regional Amateur League teams competed in this round. Seeds were applied in the single-leg round.

SL: Super League, 1L: First League, 2L: Second League, 3L: Third League, AL: Regional Amateur League. Ranks are determined by the guidelines in 2018–19 Turkish Cup Regulations.

 9 teams (69%) from Super League, 8 teams (62%) from First League, 8 teams (47%) from Second League and 3 teams (27%) from Third League qualified for the next round.
 18 seeded (64%) and 10 unseeded (36%) teams qualified for the next round.
 Biggest upset was 1461 Trabzon (ranked 110th) eliminating Bursaspor (ranked 12th).
 Lowest-ranked team qualifying for the next round was 1461 Trabzon (ranked 110th).
 Highest-ranked team eliminated was Sivasspor (ranked 6th).

|colspan="3" style="background-color:#D0D0D0" align=center|30 October 2018

|-
|colspan="3" style="background-color:#D0D0D0" align=center|31 October 2018

|-
|colspan="3" style="background-color:#D0D0D0" align=center|1 November 2018

|}

Fifth round 
 13 Super League, 8 First League, 8 Second League and 3 Third League teams competes in this round. Seeds were applied in the two-leg round.

SL: Super League, 1L: First League, 2L: Second League, 3L: Third League. Ranks are determined by the guidelines in 2018–19 Turkish Cup Regulations.

 11 teams (85%) from Super League, 4 teams (50%) from First League and 1 team (13%) from Second League qualified for the next round.
 13 seeded (81%) and 3 unseeded (19%) teams qualified for the next round.
 Biggest upset was Bodrumspor (ranked 62nd) eliminating MKE Ankaragücü (ranked 16th).
 Lowest-ranked team qualifying for the next round was Bodrumspor (ranked 62nd).
 Highest-ranked team eliminated was Çaykur Rizespor (ranked 15th).

Summary table

|-

|}

First leg

Second leg

Brackets

Round of 16 
 11 Super League, 4 First League and 1 Second League teams competed in this round. Seeds were applied in the two-leg round.

SL: Super League, 1L: First League, 2L: Second League. Ranks are determined by the guidelines in 2018–19 Turkish Cup Regulations.

 6 teams (46%) from Super League and 2 teams (25%) from First League qualified for the next round.
 5 seeded (63%) and 3 unseeded (37%) teams qualified for the next round.
 Biggest upset was Hatayspor (ranked 33rd) eliminating İstanbul Başakşehir (ranked 3rd).
 Lowest-ranked team qualifying for the next round was Hatayspor (ranked 33rd).
 Highest-ranked team eliminated was Fenerbahçe (ranked 2nd).

Summary table

|-

|}

First leg

Second leg

Quarter-finals 
 6 Super League and 2 First League teams competed in this round. Seeds were applied in the two-leg round.

Summary table

|-

|}

First leg

Second leg

Semi-finals

Summary table

|-

|}

First leg

Second leg

Final

Top goalscorers

External links
 2018–19 Turkish Cup Regulations

References 
 Turkish Football Federation Turkish Cup Results Webpage

Turkish Cup seasons
Turkish Cup
Cup